The Locked Heart is a 1918 American silent drama film directed by Henry King and starring King, Gloria Joy, and Vola Vale.

Cast
 Gloria Joy as Martha Mason 
 Henry King as Harry Mason 
 Vola Vale as Ruth Mason 
 Daniel Gilfether as Colonel Mason 
 Leon Pardue as The Villain

References

Bibliography
 Donald W. McCaffrey & Christopher P. Jacobs. Guide to the Silent Years of American Cinema. Greenwood Publishing, 1999.

External links

1918 films
1918 drama films
Silent American drama films
Films directed by Henry King
American silent feature films
1910s English-language films
American black-and-white films
1910s American films